The 1995 Men's World Team Squash Championships were held in Egypt and took place from November 14 until November 18, 1995.

Seeds

Results

Pool A

Pool B

Pool C

Pool D

Quarter-finals

Semi-finals

Third Place Play Off

Final

See also 
World Team Squash Championships
World Squash Federation
World Open (squash)

References 

World Squash Championships
Squash tournaments in Egypt
International sports competitions hosted by Egypt
Squash
Men